Leeladhar Jagudi is an Indian teacher, journalist and poet of Hindi literature. He is the author of several poetry anthologies including Natak Jari Hai and Shankha Mukhi Shikharon Par and is a recipient of the Sahitya Akademi Award, for his 1997 anthology, Anubhav Ke Aakash Mein Chand. The Government of India awarded him the fourth highest civilian honour of the Padma Shri, in 2004, for his contributions to Hindi literature.

Biography 
Jagudi was born on 1 July 1940 in a Garhwali family in Dhangan gaon, in the Tehri Garhwal district of the Indian state of Uttarakhand. After securing a master's degree (MA) in Hindi language and literature, he started his career by joining the Garhwal Rifles of the Indian Army. After retirement from the Army, he worked as a teacher in various schools and colleges before joining the Information and Public Relations Department of the Government of Uttar Pradesh, where he became the Deputy Director. Later, he turned to journalism and is the Chief Editor of Uttar Pradesh, a monthly magazine.

Jagudi has written several poems, published independently and as anthologies and his poems have been translated into English. His first anthology, Shankha Mukhi Shikharon Par, was published in 1964, followed by Natak Jari Hai, published in 1972. He published Is Yatra Mein in 1974 which preceded nine more anthologies, including Raat Ab Bhi Maujud Hai, Ghabaraye Hue Shabda, Bachi Hui Prithvi Par and award winning Anubhav Ke Aakash Mein Chand. He has also written two books on the topic of adult literacy and some of his interviews have been compiled as a book, Mere Sakshatkara, published by Kitab Ghar Prakashan in 2003. His works have been the subject of many studies, and two books, Samkalin Kavi Liladhar Jagudi aur Dhumil, written by Sharmila Saxena and published in 2008 and Samakalina Kavita aura Liladhara Jaguṛi, written by Brajamohan Sharma have been published on them.

Sahitya Akademi chose his Anubhav Ke Aakash Mein Chand for their annual award in 1997. The Government of India included him in the 2004 Republic Day Honours list for the civilian award of the Padma Shri. He is also a recipient of Raghuvir Sahay Samman, Shatadal Award of Bharat Bhasha Parishad, Namit Puraskar and Aakashvani Award. He lives in the city of Dehradun in the Dehradun district of Uttarakhand.

Selected bibliography

Awards
 Padma Shri in 2004
 Sahitya Akademi Award in 1997 for Anubhav Ke Aakash Mein Chand
 Raghuvir Sahay Samman 
 Bharatiya Bhasha Parishad Shatadal Award
 Namit Puraskar
Aakashvani Award
 Vyas Samman in 2018 for Jitne Log Utne Prem

See also 
 Garhwali people

References

External links 
 

1944 births
Living people
Recipients of the Padma Shri in literature & education
Recipients of the Sahitya Akademi Award in Hindi
Recipients of the Gangadhar National Award
People from Tehri Garhwal district
Indian male poets
Hindi-language poets
Journalists from Uttarakhand
Poets from Uttarakhand